Fundación Vida Silvestre Argentina (Argentine Wildlife Foundation) is a civil association founded on June 29, 1977, working on solving the main environmental issues of Argentina. Its mission is "to propose and implement solutions for conserving nature, promoting the sustainable use of natural resources and responsible behavior on the part of mankind in the context of climate change". To achieve this it develops actions based on the protection of natural areas, on consumption and on responsible production, environmental legislation, awareness and education.

Since 1988 Vida Silvestre represents in Argentina the World Wildlife Fund (WWF) the largest conservation entity in the world.

Vida Silvestre's vision is "a world in which human beings develop in harmony with nature". At present, its work focuses on five priority eco-regions in Argentina for their rich biodiversity which is endangered; the Paranaense rainforest, the Great Chaco, the Pampas, seas and their shores and Antarctica and southern oceans.

Vida Silvestre has two offices, located in Buenos Aires and Puerto Iguazú. It also has its own two nature reserves: Urugua-í in Misiones, and San Pablo de Valdez in Chubut.

Fundación Vida Silvestre is within the Partner Circle of the Foundations Platform F20, an international network of foundations and philanthropic organizations.

About Vida Silvestre

History 

On April 28, 1976 Alix Reynal (who, in the words of her father Mike Reynal, "whenever she was in contact with nature she was totally happy") died. This led him, in his mourning, to create a living memorial in memory of his daughter. Thus he created an organization dedicated to the conservation of the wildlife of Argentina. Reynal made contact with important people in conservation in the country such as Teodosio Brea, Felipe Lariviere and Francisco Erize.

Miguel Reynal was backed by Jose Maria Gallardo, director of the Argentine Natural History Museum, and Maximo Gainza, director editor of La Prensa daily newspaper, who with thirty men of science, sport, culture, politics and the business community, joined up to face the challenge of founding an institution. Their agreement was signed on June 29, 1977, in the Argentine Museum of Natural History.

From the very start they worked with the intention of slowly reaching tangible results, with scientific backing. It required the management to be overseen by the scientific sector which was achieved by the creation of a committee of specialists who helped to choose programs and evaluate results.
In 1988 Vida Silvestre became the official representative of WWF in Argentina.

Workteam 

Management is divided in two parts.

The administrative council, currently presided by Marina Harteneck. It also has support from a scientific committee formed by a team of specialists.

The management structure is a team made up of some 40 persons who include biologists, agriculturalists, foresters, electrical engineers, geographers, museum specialists, communicators, teachers, lawyers, environmental scientists, politicians, all working in three offices – Buenos Aires, Iguazu and Mar del Plata. As of 2017, Vida Silvestre's CEO is Manuel Jaramillo.

Work 

Overuse of natural resources is the major topic of Vida Silvestre's work.

At present human activity uses up more resources than our planet can provide. As a result, we need 1.3 planets to support human activity and conserve species and ecosystems that are in danger.

Climate change is the most visible result of humanity's use of natural resources on a global scale. To face this situation Vida Silvestre defined four work strategies.

For more protected areas 

Throughout its history Vida Silvestre has been involved in the creation and effective management of over twenty protected public areas, marine and on land, municipal, provincial and national thus contributing to the protection of over 7.5 million hectares destined for conservation and sustainable use of nature. This has been achieved through various forms of participation – purchase of lands for donating to the state; management and support actions of public policies, and identification, evaluation, and drawing up of areas for consideration and/or revision of projects, laws or decrees.
In this sense different strategies are followed, such as the identification of valuable areas for conservation in priority eco-regions with the object of encouraging the creation of protected areas.

In 1983 Vida Silvestre did a survey of the Urugua-í stream in Misiones, where a dam was planned, and proposed measures to compensate the loss of natural areas which led to the creation of Islas Malvinas Provincial Reserve protecting ten thousand hectares of Atlantic rainforest and its subsequent increase to the 87 thousand hectares of the Uruguaí Provincial Park.

In 1985 the Somuncura plateau in Patagonia was explored and from the report in which Vida Silvestre proposed its conservation in 1986 the Somuncura Plateau Provincial Reserve of one million hectares in northern Patagonia was created. Two years later Vida Silvestre started the first complete evaluation of Patagonia's coastal areas and initiated the paper work for the creation of Cabo Blanco Provincial Park with the Isla Pinguino Complex – Oso Marino Bay, which in 2010 was declared an inter-jurisdictional marine park, and Monte Leon Island a national park since 2004.

Vida Silvestre actively promotes the creation and management of protected areas with important precedents for Argentina and the region. In 2003 Vida Silvestre was awarded the Conservar el Futuro Prize by the National Parks Administration in recognition of its work on protected areas.

Some of the contributions include the first two private reserves in Argentina, today a fundamental system of conservation: in 1979 Laguna de los Escarchados in the province of Santa Cruz, and the Campos del Tuyú, a wildlife reserve in the province of Buenos Aires, this last under an agreement with the land owners. In 2009 Campos del Tuyú was donated to the National Parks Administration, thus creating the first national park in the Pampas grasslands.

In 1997 through an agreement with Alto Parana S.A., a reserve of 3243 hectares bordering the Urugua-í provincial park, the Urugua-í Wildlife Reserve was created, and administered by Vida Silvestre. Eight years later the San Pablo de Valdez Wildlife Reserve (7360 hectares) came into being, the first private property to protect the habitat within Peninsula Valdez provincial natural area, a world heritage site of UNESCO.

In 1983 the Ribera Norte Wildlife refuge was created under an agreement with San Isidro municipality – the first protected municipal area in the country.
Two years later thanks to a team coordinated by Vida Silvestre, the Costanera Sur Ecological Reserve came into being, the most important area for biodiversity in Buenos Aires city with over 300 hectares.

In 1991 the National Parks Administration created Otamendi National Reserve in Buenos Aires province following a recommendation by Vida Silvestre. That same year the Punta Rasa Municipal Reserve of 520 hectares of coastal grassland and dunes was also created by initiative of Vida Silvestre because of research made on the importance of the area for migratory birds.

In 2014 Vida Silvestre supported the creation of El Impenetrable National Park, part of La Fidelidad Estancia in Chaco Province, one of the last stands of Chaco Woodland.

Other conservation- related activities include the environmental impact studies of gas pipelines in the northern Andes and Atacama desert and a series of proposed areas for compensation. Thanks to this, reserves El Nogalar (4000 hectares) and Provincial Park Laguna Pintascayo (12,139 hectares) both in Salta Province came into being.

Meanwhile, for ten years, Vida Silvestre trained 50 technicians and park rangers, as well as national rangers for protected areas on the Atlantic coasts of Argentina, Uruguay and the State of Rio Grande do Sul (Brazil) in tools and methods of monitoring migratory shore-birds. Through agreements with ranger training centers, scholarships for students from the Urugua-í and San Pablo de Valdez Wildlife Reserves were a further contribution.

As from 1987 the Vida Silvestre Wildlife Refuge Programme has grown successfully, the first system of voluntarily protected areas in Argentina, the pioneer programme for Latin America, with over 177,000 hectares of high biological value in 9 provinces in the country. Some of these are over 10 years old.

Since 2014 Vida Silvestre has coordinated the Argentine network of private nature reserves which encompasses different organizations in private conservation: 58 reserves covering over 180,000 hectares in 15 provinces and 15 different private organizations in a unique network at a national level. Vida Silvestre participates in the management committee as an organizer, as well as owner, because of its own wildlife reserves.

Towards effective legislation 

According to Article 41 of Argentina's constitution, all inhabitants have a right to a healthy environment, balanced, fit for human development and where productive activities satisfy present needs without committing those of future generations, and must preserve them. By law priority must be given to reparation of environmental damage. Authorities will ensure the fulfillment of this requirement, proper use of natural resources, preservation of natural and cultural heritage and biological diversity, as well as environmental information and education.

For this reason Vida Silvestre works non-stop with governments, legislators, and organizations to have an input in environmental legislation, promote a state policy that plans strategically; and support procedures that guarantee environmental protection.

In 1990 Vida Silvestre took to court, oral and public, the first environmental case against illegal trade of wildlife. This ended in a conviction. Three years later, in 1993 the organization collected 1,200,000 signatures from citizens to back the inclusion of Environmental Crime in the Civil Code. Though the aim was not achieved it was the first step towards awakening the public to the importance of the subject.

Towards the end of 2007 Congress approved law 26.331 for Minimal Budgets for Environmental Protection of natural woodlands. However the Executive Government only brought out the pertinent regulations in February 2009, after an appeal made by over 70 social organizations, Vida Silvestre amongst them.

The Woodland Law (Ley de Bosques) makes the provinces responsible for the territorial order of their native woodlands (Orden Territorial de Bosques Nativos) through a participative process, categorizing the possible uses of wooded lands: from conservation to the possibility of transformation to agricultural ends, or the sustainable exploitation of the woods.

Thus woodlands undergo zoning as follows: first category (red) areas of very high value for conservation that should never be cleared nor used for the extraction of timber, but kept as woodland forever. This would include nature reserves and surrounding areas with outstanding biological values, and/or areas that protect important watersheds (headwaters of streams and rivers); second category (yellow) areas of high or medium conservation interest that can have been degraded but with restoration could have high conservation value. These areas may not be cleared (deforested) but may be used for the following: sustainable use, tourism, scientific collection and studies; third category (green): sectors of low conservation value that could be partially or totally altered, after an environmental impact evaluation.

As from the passing of the woodlands law the average yearly deforestation has been reduced by almost 20 percent, passing from about 280,000 to 230,000 hectares yearly. This figure is still too high. Between 2008 and 2011 some 932,109 hectares in the jurisdictions evaluated by the experts in Santiago del Estero province, 399,660 hectares of native woodland had been cleared; in Salta it was 222,868 hectares; in Formosa 113,109 Hectares; and Chaco province lost 102,592 hectares. This shows that between passing the law and late 2012, 1,145,044 hectares were cleared of forest.

Vida Silvestre believes that special attention should be paid to the Chaco eco-region which has been subjected to the greatest loss of native woodlands over the last 20 years. This makes it essential that dialogue be held between the provincial governments to revise their territorial ordering of natural woodland that cross political borders, and that there should be uninterrupted landscape between the different provinces that include the eco-region. A complete revision of the possible alternative models of sustainable production also needs to be implemented in the yellow areas of the map, within the framework of genuine dialogue and analysis, between the social, productive and environmental sectors.

These matters in question are fundamental to solve and initiate administrative mechanisms to improve the efficiency of using the funds provided by the laws through the provinces, with additions to the funds corresponding to the National government's budget. The Woodland Law is a tool to be applied properly for the conservation of our native woodlands. In this sense Vida Silvestre participates in and monitors the application of this standard norm in the provinces within the priority eco-regions: Gran Chaco (Chaco, Formosa, Salta, Santiago del Estero) and the Panaraense rainforest (Misiones) to promote sustainable use over time, of the native woodlands of Argentina.

In 2013 Vida Silvestre through its Earth Hour campaign promoted the law to create the first Protected Marine Area in the country, of the Burdwood Bank (Namuncurá) some 34,000 square kilometers of great biodiversity subject to environmental changes, located within Argentina's exclusive economy zone. With technical data this undersea plateau increases the area of protected Argentine seas from one percent to about 3.2 percent. That same year Vida Silvestre organized the first International Meeting on Protected Oceanic Marine Areas. The meeting aimed at government representatives, civil organizations, research institutes, and the private sector working on the conservation of marine resources, was aimed at improving the local capacity and providing tools for the creation and implementation of a system of protected marine areas, the law being passed in 2014.

For responsible production and consumption 

All stages of production generate an impact on the environment, which does not depend solely on the activity as such, but also on the ways they are carried out. The main factors of the ecological footprint in Argentina are the source and consumption of energy, and the changes in soil use as a result of agricultural and forestry practices.

Argentina is basically a producer and exporter of commodities, with its natural resources covers its internal consumption needs and that of distant regions such as Europe and USA. This is why Vida Silvestre works in coordination with WWF to promote changes in the global market aimed at countries, companies and citizens to develop commercial practices that try to reduce the global ecological footprint and as a result, the impact on climate change and natural resources.

Forestry 

Since 2002 the organization promotes responsible forest management leading the forest certification in Argentina under FSC standards and the creation of the Forestry Business Network. The FSC (Forest Stewardship Council) is an international organization whose object is to promote environmentally responsible, socially beneficial and economically viable uses of the world's forest. To achieve its aims it has developed national and international standards and the system of certification to identify and label products from well-managed forests. This has been developed with the participation of different interest groups such as forest owners, administrators, producers of forestry products, local communities and NGOs amongst others.
Vida Silvestre is a member of FSC's environmental committee and from 2002 to mid 2006, FSC's contact organization in Argentina. During this period Vida Silvestre assumed responsibility for promoting their certification system at a national level. As well as activities of promoting FSC in the country; during that time a work group of representatives of environmental, social and economic sectors was formed. With them were drawn up the Procedures for Development of Norms for Management of Forests in Argentina, and the country's norms for Forest Management of plantations.

Energy 

In 2006 Vida Silvestre presented the report on the Energy Situation in Argentina between 2006-2020; it was estimated the reduction potential for that period could be between 30 and 48 percent referring to emissions foreseen for 2020, if policies for reducing consumption are applied. An important part of this potential saving is in the residential sector and the commercial/public sector. These two sectors represent 62 percent of the potential saving of electricity.

In 2011 Vida Silvestre published the WWF study on renewable energy: "100 % Renewable Energy by 2050" which shows that the energy needs of the planet can be satisfied in a "clean" renewable way as well as economically possible, by 2050. The report which took two years preparation includes an analysis carried out by WWF and a setting presenting by Ecofys, specialists on the subject of energies. The analysis shows that by 2050 energy production for transport, industrial activities and domestic needs, could be obtained with but a tiny fraction of fossil and nuclear fuels. Energy efficiency in buildings, vehicles and industries will be the key ingredient together with energy from electricity generated in a sustainable way, distributed via "intelligent" electricity networks to reach their objective.

In 2013 this report was updated. Argentina's energy 2013-2030, with efficiency policies reflected in the measures already implemented in the sector has started to show concrete results.

Further, Vida Silvestre promotes the application of energy efficiency labeling on various products so that consumers can consider options with reduced emissions. Energy efficiency labeling with information on such products provides adequate data from the energy point of view. Argentina's energy efficiency labeling, as in Europe and other countries shows a comparative scale of types of efficiency, identified with colors and letters that vary according to the apparatus, informing in a simple way the level of energy an apparatus uses.

So far in Argentina this is obligatory for refrigerators, lamps, washing machines, air conditioners, cooking stoves, railways, and water heaters. The system can be enlarged to cover all appliances such as electric motors, gas equipment, homes, automobiles, doors and windows, etc.

Fishery 

Vida Silvestre aims at establishing a sustainable fishing model, working with different sectors related to the sea to promote sustainable administered fishing, adequately regulated and implemented through sustainable and responsible fishing practices, environmentally friendly, and all this within the framework of a new model of fisheries development that guarantees economic environmental social and political sustainability of the sector based on varying strategies.

These would include a system of fisheries-management based on the best scientific information available, applying precautionary criteria and an eco-systemic approach; developing a participative governability that contributes towards generating agreement and commitment between all parties and promoting responsible fishing practices. It includes public access to the information; updating the legal framework, with dynamic focusing that ensures compliance with fisheries policies regarding sustainable management; implement a system of monitoring fisheries which is efficient and clear, giving trustworthy data (statistics; control checking of inboard catch; discarded rejects and off-loading rejects, and with onboard observers); adjusting the potential catch to the availability of the resource; incorporating selective capture technologies; optimizing technological and economical aspects to raise the value of fishery resources, taking advantage of incidental catch, diversifying products and processing them with value added and intensive labor.

So after the coordinated work, the first fisheries management model based in Argentina's ecosystem based in Golfo San Matías, Rio Negro province, was developed. This model fishery was concrete evidence that all this is possible. Since 2004, together with local companies, the government of the province of Rio Negro and the Marine Biology Institute (MBI) in San Antonio Oeste, Vida Silvestre promotes the Golfo San Matias as a model to follow.
At the same time the national authorities were encouraged to back planning of the industry based on the best scientific data available, considering the sustainability of the resource as a basis for fishing. Vida Silvestre works simultaneously on informing on fishing problems, especially with hake, having campaigned towards dealing only with adult specimens (yielding fillets of over 20 cm in length) and proposals of markets for other species of fish.
As to the certification, Vida Silvestre promoted a sustainable environmental alternative through a program of fishery licensing of the Marine Stewardship Council (MSC). Such licensing of fisheries aims at recognizing and favoring good fishing practices and providing a simple way for buyers and consumers to identify sustainable marine resources. In Argentina at present there are three fisheries with MSC certification: Patagonian scallops (2006), the first scallop in the world to be thus certified, the anchovy sardine of Buenos Aires (2012) the world's first such fishery to be certified (2011) and the Argentine hake (2012). Including these in a medium long term plan, MSC's ecolabelling is aimed as a tool for regional, sustainable development.

Livestock 

Studies aimed at identifying important areas for the conservation of Pampas grasslands and wildlife (especially birds) that depend on them have shown that well-kept pampas grasslands were mostly private properties and the reason that they were well preserved was mostly due to having been used carefully for extensive cattle raising.

So Vida Silvestre deduced that these ranchers and their extensive cattle-raising were conservation's allies. Since then we work together with the productive sector to conserve and manage carefully this natural capital – the Pampas grassland, home to a valuable and unique biodiversity, in many cases threatened with extinction, but at the same time a grazing resource supporting one of the most important economic activities of the country.
Meanwhile, Vida Silvestre has identified some management practices that generate changes in the habitat, such as permanent grazing, introduction of winter forage through use of herbicides, inadequate management of livestock "loads" and replacement of natural grassland by sown lays. At the same time such practices may hasten degradation of the pasture and start erosion and salinization of the soil with negative effects on production.
In 2006, together with members of the Field Veterinary Program of the Wildlife Conservation Society a model sanitary program was drawn up for production together with conservation in cattle lands of Samborombón Bay. This was developed from a series of studies of cattle on lands neighboring protected areas in the region. It included not only direct evaluation of infectious diseases and the parasitological situation, but also surveys of cattle breeders in the area to evaluate their sanitary measures.

Together with Aves Argentinas and the Grasslands Alliance Initiative and with the support of INTA (National Institute of Agricultural Technology), Vida Silvestre carried out the project Grassland and Savannahs of the Southern Cone of South America: an initiative for their conservation in Argentina, with the main objective of promoting sustainable cattle ranching in grasslands, promoting the inclusion of nature conservation and production. 21 farms covering some 59,700 hectares are already being worked with sustainable cattle-raising following the results of the program. In the region within the Grassland Alliance this increases to 121,000 hectares that participate in the certification program.

In this way and with technical assistance, environmental evaluation and monitoring, as well as management policies and incentives applied to sustainable production systems, Vida Silvestre seeks to support those who show willingness and interest in the conservation in our natural resources.

Soy 

As a consequence of soy production huge areas of woodlands, grasslands and savannah were lost to agriculture. All together the area of land in South America where soy beans are grown increased from 17 million hectares in 1990 to 46 million in 2010, mostly on lands converted from natural eco-systems. Between 2000 and 2010 there were 24 million hectares converted to crops in South America and soy beans increased some 20 million over the same period.
On this subject Vida Silvestre participates in the RTRS (Round Table for Responsible Soy) in search for a solution, considering that the sustainability of the soil and water should interest the producer because they are part of his production resources, his possibility of further crops in the future. Sound agricultural practices must be generally adopted, including crop rotation; integrated management of pests, responsible use of agrochemicals, and conservation- oriented tilling of the soil. These practices are understood and known to all, communicated by private and official organizations. Regrettably their application is not generally practiced. All this can be promoted through public policies that establish regulatory, clear and imposable frameworks as well as incentives for sustainable production to be made more profitable.

Further, on this subject, WWF in 2014, published "Growing Soy: Impact and Solutions" that explains the magnitude of the problem, the factors that favor it, and how each one of us has a role in implementing solutions.

Toward more awareness and environmental education 

Vida Silvestre has been involved in environmental education since 1978 through pioneering in exposing adults and children to Nature through conservation safaris. These produced a generation of nature-aware people through camps that combined adventure with getting to know Argentina's natural riches, with fun and learning about the value of Nature. Over 7000 participants got to know about wildlife and such through more than 150 educational safaris.
In 2014 Vida Silvestre re-launched the safari program with trips that include recreation in contact with Nature, aimed at all sectors of the public; children, youth of scholastic age, Vida Silvestre members, companies, families, teachers.... They partake in activities in Nature, are exposed to teamwork under tutelage of biologists, park rangers, and experts in the field.

As from 1982 our magazine Vida Silvestre has been published, being the first in Argentina to cover conservation topics. Over time it has received several prizes for exposing the problems of the environment, including the ADEPA prize in 1999 and 2003 and the Santa Clara de Asis in 2004. The latest issues may be consulted free of charge in their digital edition in Vida Silvestre's website.

A pioneer in covering environmental topics, in 1981 Vida Silvestre sponsored the TV series Wonderful World of Animals aired on Saturdays on public television. In 1982 Argentina's leading naturalists gave courses on conservation for Vida Silvestre; they included Pablo Canevari, Jose Maria Gallardo and Enrique Bucher.

In 1986 educational guides and posters were printed covering the various natural regions of the country, the first such in this field. The next year this was followed up by a poster on the Misiones Subtropical Forest. In 1997 Vida Silvestre put out a box of educational material on the Andean deer (huemul) after a great effort for the conservation of this emblematic species from Patagonia. That same year educational material "Aprendé Jugando" (Learn while Playing) with Villa del Sur bottled water, was very popular.

For Vida Silvestre teachers fill a central role in the awakening in the up-and-coming generations about how humans relate to Nature. For this reason we continually offer different tools for teachers throughout the country to incorporate in their environmental subjects.

Allied to prestigious places of learning Vida Silvestre offers courses, seminars, talks and training to teachers for them to find a way to share their knowledge and experiences under guidance from various experts on the subject. In 1992 there were 1000 teachers trained by Vida Silvestre; in 2010 a box of materials was prepared for Misiones province; 25 teachers and 200 students received materials in 130 schools. Indirectly this reached 528 teachers and 5,300 students in the province. In 2012 a similar box of materials to cover the urban environment was launched in Buenos Aires; it reached 1000 schools plus 4000 students. That same year teacher-training courses were held in 5 provinces, reaching 100 teachers.

Work with local fauna

Pampas deer and others 

In 1992 Vida Silvestre launched a campaign for "adoption" of Pampas deer: this is a grassland species in critical danger of extinction with only 4 small populations in the country. Earlier Vida Silvestre had created a natural reserve (Campos del Tuyú) to protect its habitat. In 1996 "Grasslands and Pampas Deer" a video of the San Luis specimens, was edited. Today the challenge is to promote sustainable cattle raising in Tuyú's neighboring lands. Cattle-ranching there is producing quality beef from natural grasslands which also provide prime habitat for the endangered Pampas deer. This has been made possible by the joint efforts of ranchers, municipalities, national and provincial organizations. There are possibly only 3000 of these Pampas deer in the country, all but a very few sharing habitat with cattle – preservation of the habitat through management and good husbandry practices are essential to the Pampas deers' conservation.

Other work with deer carried out by Vida Silvestre includes the Huemul Project started in 1986 to protect one of the scarcest deer in the world, resident in Argentina's Patagonia. Three years later, thanks to Vida Silvestre this species was declared a "natural monument". In 1997 an educational box on the huemul was launched, the contents awakening awareness of the plight of this species. Further, in 1978 Vida Silvestre, together with New York Zoological Society and the National Parks Administration set up a breeding facility for the pudu on Victoria Island. In 1986 Vida Silvestre made the first release of this species back into Nahuel Huapi National Park.

Whales and other cetaceans 

Between May and December every year some 2400 southern right whales return to the Gulfs bordering Valdez Peninsula – a World Natural Heritage Site – to breed and bear their offspring. Vida Silvestre works in monitoring just what happens in the region to help in the slow but constant recuperation of this species and others associated with it through regulating activities in the gulfs, an especially in Nueva bay. In 1983 Vida Silvestre led the first campaign of whale- and dolphin-watching in the Antarctic. The next year it headed an appeal to stop whaling.

Since 1999 Vida Silvestre supports the Estimate of the Abundance of Southern Right Whales and Other Small Cetaceans in the Area of Valdez Peninsula that the Centro Nacional Patagonico carries out yearly by aerial census. Thanks to the information thus gathered it is now known that the number of whales has doubled over the last 10 years; today there are some 2500 that visit Valdez. In the same year Vida Silvestre started a photographic catalogue for identification of individuals from these images of the right whales of Valdez. Thanks to a provincial initiative, tour operators, tour agencies, research institutes, Vida Silvestre and other NGOs, a law has been passed that regulates the main activity of the area by setting behavioral codes for whale watching. At present Vida Silvestre monitors the correct implementation of the law.

In 2011, together with local and international organization Vida Silvestre called for diplomatic action to reject Japan's recent announcement that it was renewing its "scientific" harvest of whales in the Southern Oceans. That same year WWF published a document on climate change and how this affects whales. It was distributed by Vida Silvestre.

Pumas and guanacos 

In 2012 Vida Silvestre launched a campaign for the protection of the puma and the guanaco which got enormous public support because of proposed laws declaring them "plague species"; in Rio Negro Province law no. 763/72 economically encourages those who kill pumas on their property, while in Santa Cruz province resolution 109 of the Chamber of Deputies declared the guanaco a pest species because of their large numbers, their biological characteristics and their economic damage as well as the harm to Society they produce. Vida Silvestre sent letters to the responsible authorities in each province requesting that they abolish the measures and launched a campaign to collect signatures over one week receiving 36,000 adherents.

Jaguars 

In Argentina there are less than 200 jaguars left. Loss of their woodland and forest habitat as a result of deforestation, illegal hunting, or indiscriminate killing of their prey species, and conflicts with farm stock directly affect the survival of these animals. According to studies over these last years it is estimated that in the Paranaense rain forest some 60 individuals still survive.

This emblematic species, a natural monument of Argentina, is a priority for Vida Silvestre who since 2003 has funded researchers from CelBA-CONICET jointly with the Ministry of Ecology, Misiones Renewable Natural Resources Secretariat, and the National Parks Administration in developing projects to study the situation of the jaguar in the Paranaense Rain Forest. All the information obtained in these years has been basic in drawing up a jaguar conservation plan. The studies so far have revealed that the population of jaguars in the Paranaense suffered a drastic decrease over the last 15 years. This shows us the need to take serious concrete action to turn this situation around. Vida Silvestre supports researches by providing funds and broadcasting this specie's problems. Further the jaguar is a priority species for WWF who support jaguar programmes in several countries where this species exists, such as Peru and Brazil.

In 2014 with the help of Vida Silvestre, the documentary Jaguar: The Last Frontier was released, directed by Marcelo Viñas and produced by Juan Maria Raggio, narrated by Ricardo Darin, depicting the status of the species and the problems it faces. The documentary had its premiere in various cinemas and festivals, was released through internet, reaching over 25,000 people in this country.

See also 
 WWF (World Wide Fund for Nature)

References

Environmental organisations based in Argentina